Marco Battilana (born 30 May 1976 in St. Gallen, Switzerland) is a Swiss curler.

He played on the 2006 Winter Olympics where Swiss men's team finished on fifth place.

Teams

References

External links
 
 Trainerteam Nachwuchs - swisscurling 
 
 Video:  

Living people
1976 births
Sportspeople from St. Gallen (city)
Swiss male curlers
Swiss curling champions
Olympic curlers of Switzerland
Curlers at the 2006 Winter Olympics
21st-century Swiss people